Baulme-la-Roche is a commune in the Côte-d'Or department in the Bourgogne-Franche-Comté region of eastern France.

The inhabitants of the commune are known as Rochebalmiens or Rochebalmiennes.

Geography

Baulme-la-Roche is located some 17 km west by north-west of Dijon and 8 km north-east of Sombernon. Access to the commune is by the D104C from Mâlain in the south which passes through the commune and the village and continues north-east to join the D10 south-east of Panges. The Paris–Marseille railway passes through the commune and the entrance to the Blaisy-Bas Tunnel is in the commune. The nearest station is at Malain south of the commune. The commune is mostly farmland but there are extensive forests - especially in the east.

The Douix river rises in the west of the commune and flows south-east to join the Ouche east of Sainte-Marie-sur-Ouche. The Ruisseau de Baulme-la-Roche rises in the centre of the commune and flows south-west to join the Douix.

Toponymy
Baulme-la-Roche appears as Beaume la Roche on the 1750 Cassini Map and the same on the 1790 version.

Heraldry

Administration

List of Successive Mayors

Demography
In 2017 the commune had 90 inhabitants.

Culture and heritage

Civil heritage
The commune has a number of buildings and sites that are registered as historical monuments:
A Farmhouse (16th century)
A House (1807)
A Farmhouse (18th century)
A House (19th century)
A Blacksmith's House (1818)
A Fountain at Rue Landel (1822)
Houses and farms (17th-19th century)
A Fountain at la Dhuys (1822)

Religious heritage
The commune has several religious buildings and sites that are registered as historical monuments:
A Benedictine Priory (1502)
The Parish Church of Saint Martin (15th century)

The Church contains a large number of items that are registered as historical objects. In total, including civil heritage, there are 40 historical objects in the commune.

See also
Communes of the Côte-d'Or department

References

Communes of Côte-d'Or
Côte-d'Or communes articles needing translation from French Wikipedia